Beaufils is a French surname. Notable people with the surname include:

Armel Beaufils (1882–1952), French sculptor
Marie-France Beaufils (born 1946), French politician

French-language surnames